Friedrich Wilhelm, Count of Brandenburg (24 January 1792 – 6 November 1850) was a morganatic son of King Frederick William II and politician, who served as Minister President of Prussia from 1848 until his death.

Life
Born in the Prussian capital Berlin, he was the son of King Frederick William II of Prussia (1744–1797) from his morganatic marriage with Sophie von Dönhoff (1768–1838). He and his younger sister Julie (1793–1848) received the comital title von Brandenburg in 1794, and were raised with the sons of Hofmarschall Valentin von Massow. His sister married Duke Frederick Ferdinand of Anhalt-Köthen in 1816.

On 18 April 1806, Friedrich Wilhelm joined the Prussian Army by entering the Gardes du Corps regiment and from the next year participated in the Napoleonic War of the Fourth Coalition. In 1812 he achieved the rank of Rittmeister in the staff of Ludwig Yorck von Wartenburg, leading the Prussian auxiliary forces in support of the French invasion of Russia. In 1839 he was elevated to Lieutenant general of the VI Army Corps. By 1848, he had distinguished himself in several battles and was a cavalry general.  

During the German revolutions of 1848–49, in November 1848, his half-nephew King Frederick William IV called him back to Berlin to succeed Ernst von Pfuel as Prussian minister president. The appointment reflected the king's intention to quell the ongoing uprisings. Jointly with Interior Minister Otto Theodor von Manteuffel, he had the revolutionary Prussian National Assembly suppressed and dissolved on December 5, while a reactionary Constitution was decreed.

In October 1850, he traveled to the Warsaw Conference to meet with Czar Nicholas and sound out the Russian stance in the Austria-Prussia rivalry. Though he had initially supported the implementation of the Prussian-led Erfurt Union, he shied away from an armed conflict with Austria as State Chancellor Prince Felix of Schwarzenberg was able to strengthen the alliance with the Russian Empire isolating the Prussian side. After his return, Friedrich Wilhelm spoke out against mobilising the Prussian Army as advocated by Foreign Minister Joseph von Radowitz. Shortly afterwards, he took seriously ill and died, it is said from the humiliation of the Czar's abandonment of the Erfurt policy. He was buried in the crypt of Berlin Cathedral.

Family
Friedrich Wilhelm Count von Brandenburg married Mathilde Aurora von Massenbach on May 24, 1818 in Potsdam (October 24, 1795-March 5, 1885). They had eight children:

Friedrich (1819-1892), Prussian general
Wilhelm (1819-1892), Prussian general
Friedrich Wilhelm Gustav (August 24, 1820-March 9, 1909), Prussian envoy in Brussels and Lisbon
Wilhelmine Charlotte Friederike Julie Alexandrine (November 18, 1821-August 8, 1902), honorary lady in Heiligengrabe
Luise Julie (May 31, 1823-August 24, 1884), honorary lady in Heiligengrabe
Friederike Wilhelmine Elisabeth Mathilde (April 4, 1825-February 26, 1900), she married on May 24, 1847 Maj. Erdmann Alexander Georg von Pückler (April 22, 1820-November 11, 1864)
Friederike Wilhelmine Georgine Elisabeth (July 2, 1828-September 13, 1893)
Alexandra Friederike Wilhelmine Marianne (May 3, 1834-December 5, 1885), she was a lady-in-waiting of the Empress Augusta

References 
Ferdinand Freiherr von Meerheimb, “Brandenburg, Friedrich Wilhelm, Count” in Allgemeine Deutsche Biographie, Band 3 (Leipzig, 1876), S. 238-239. 
Carl Schurz, Reminiscences (3 volumes), New York: The McClure Company, 1907.  In Chapter VI of Volume One, Schurz mentions Brandenburg's appointment as prime minister of Prussia as a step of reactionary character.

Generals of Cavalry (Prussia)
Prussian politicians
People of the Revolutions of 1848
1792 births
1850 deaths
Foreign ministers of Prussia
Prussian Army personnel of the Napoleonic Wars